The North American Discworld Convention (a.k.a. NADWCon) is a fan-run science fiction convention to celebrate the works of Sir Terry Pratchett, focusing primarily on his long-running series of Discworld novels. It is held biennially on odd-numbered years to accommodate the UK Discworld Convention, which is on even-numbered years. The first NADWCon was held in 2009  and sponsored by Arizona-based LepreCon, Inc. The 2019 convention is to be held July 12th-15th, at the Westin LAX.

The NADWCon program includes several large-scale events, such as the Gala Banquet, Maskerade (honoring Pratchett's novel of the same name), Charity Auction, and Guest of Honor Interview. The 2009 convention also featured a convention-wide Seamstress Guild Party on the opening night. These large events are mixed with smaller panels, discussion groups, games, guest klatches, and other activities.

History
Discworld Conventions have been held in the UK since 1996, but prior to 2009 one had not been successfully attempted in North America. On Tuesday, Sept. 13, 2005, Pratchett did a booksigning and Q & A session for Thud! at Olsson's Books & Records in Arlington, VA, and was asked during the Q & A portion (by the future Vice Chair of NADWCon2009) whether he would be willing to attend a North American convention if one were to be organized for him - to which he heartily answered "yes." Planning for the convention began that night and gained momentum until, after securing sponsorship from LepreCon, Inc. and acquiring a number of experienced convention runners for its chair and committee positions, registration for the 2009 convention opened in November 2007. Registration capped out and closed prior to the 2009 convention, at approximately 1,040 members.

NADWCon2009 ran from Sept. 4 - 7, 2009. There was also a pre-convention event on Sept. 3, and a library appearance by Sir Terry Pratchett (made possible by NADWCon, but not part of the official convention) at the Glendale, AZ library on September 8. The convention was considered a great success, and he declared it "the best Discworld Convention" he'd ever been to.
NADWCon2011 was held in Madison, Wisconsin on July 8–11, 2011, at the Madison Concourse Hotel and Governor's Club.
NADWCon2013 was held in Baltimore, Maryland on July 5–8, 2013, at the Baltimore Marriott Waterfront Hotel.
NADWCon2017 was held in New Orleans, Louisiana on September 1–4, 2017, at the Sheraton New Orleans.
NADWCon2019 will be held in Los Angeles, California on July 12–15, 2019, at the Westin LAX.

Infrastructure
Following the successful conclusion of NADWCon2009, an oversight and sponsorship committee, dubbed The Guild of Chelonavigators, was formed to decide the location of the next convention and to maintain any archives and assets of the conventions from year to year. Announcing the formation of The Guild of Chelonavigators and soliciting bids for NADWCon2011]</ref> The Guild consisted of a chair, four voting members, and a consulting member.  The Guild was not actively involved in planning the biennial conventions; rather, it acted as an advisor to the convention's planning committee, and a sponsor to the convention as needed. In 2015 the Guild of Chelonavigators was disbanded. The NADWCon2013 planning committee, RavenQuoth, Inc, applied for and were awarded a license with the Estate of Sir Terry Pratchett. They will be in charge of running future events, starting with NADWCon2017.

Marks
The logo for NADWCon2009 featured the convention name encircling a stylized turtle and the number '2009.' The motto of the convention was, "The Turtle Moves!" The turtle seal was designed by Emily S. Whitten, Vice Chair and Webmaster of NADWCon2009, who owns the rights to the design. The Guild of Chelonavigators has adopted the stylized turtle, with permission, for its logo.

The logo for NADWCon2011 features a black owl with a white ankh defining its beak and doubling as chest-markings for the owl, sitting on the "2011," and encircled by the convention name in yellow and red. The owl is grasping sausage links in its claws, which trail down to encompass the 2011 convention logo: "More Ankh, Morpork!"  The owl seal was designed by Jon Lemerond, Vice Chair of NADWCon2011.

The logo for NADWCon2013 features a traditional disc with four elephants, but the turtle, Great A'Tuin, has been replaced by a Maryland blue crab, which Baltimore is famed for. The crab holds in its claw a banner which reads "The Turtle Moved!" The original concept was conceived by Ben Jarashow and the final design was created by Ray Friesen.

The logo for NADWCon2017 features a phoenix within a ring, like a franking mark. The motto of the convention is "The Genuan Experience" to reflect the roundworld city of New Orleans where the NADWCon2017 is to be held. The logo was designed by Amy Atha-Nicholls, Marketing & Communications Director, NADWCon2017.

The logo for NADWCon2019 features a movie camera, imp with paintbrush, inside a film cel, with tentacles coming from behind. The motto of the convention is "Hooray for Holy Wood". The logo was designed by Dan Cowen.

References

External links
 The North American Discworld Convention official website
 NADWCon Twitter feed
 The current North American Discworld Convention Facebook page
 2008 Interview with Sir Terry Pratchett, by Emily S. Whitten, in which he discusses NADWCon2009
 The Washington Post: Book World Live: 'Discworld' Author Terry Pratchett (Terry mentions NADWCon2009)
 Terry Pratchett Books site at HarperCollins

Discworld organisations
Recurring events established in 2009
Conventions in the United States